Giornale delle Dame e delle Mode di Francia, was an Italian fashion magazine, published between 1786 and 1794.   It is recognized to be one of the first fashion magazines in the world.

The magazine was preceded by the Cabinet des Modes, which became the world's first fashion magazine one year prior, and was followed by  Journal des Luxus und der Moden (1786-1827) in Germany and Giornale delle Dame e delle Mode di Francia in Italy (1786-1794), which thereby became the second and the third fashion magazine in the world, respectively. As the French fashion magazine was discontinued during the French revolution, its two foreign successors came to have a leading role in the fashion journalism of Europa for several years, when the branch was still a new a pioneer one.

References

Fashion magazines published in Italy
Magazines established in 1786
Magazines disestablished in 1794
1786 establishments in Italy
1794 disestablishments in Italy
Defunct magazines published in Italy
Italian-language magazines
Magazines published in Milan